Sarabande and Danse may refer to:

Sarabande and Danse (Clifford), a ballet by John Clifford
Sarabande and Danse (d'Amboise), a ballet by Jacques d'Amboise